The 2020–21 FA WSL season (also known as the Barclays FA Women's Super League for sponsorship reasons) was the tenth edition of the FA Women's Super League (WSL) since it was formed in 2010. It was the third season after the rebranding of the four highest levels in English women's football.

From the 2020–21 season, the FA WSL was given three Champions League places per season, increased from the previous two.

Chelsea were the defending champions, having been awarded the 2019–20 title on a points-per-game basis following the curtailment of the season due to COVID-19 pandemic in England. They became the first team since Liverpool in 2014 to defend a WSL title.

Teams
Twelve teams contested the FA WSL this season. At the end of the previous season, Liverpool were relegated while Aston Villa were promoted.

Stadium changes 
Four teams changed home ground prior to the start of the season: Reading relocated from Adams Park in High Wycombe to the Madejski Stadium, home of the team's male affiliate since it was constructed in 1998. Newly-promoted Aston Villa signed a two-year deal with Walsall to play their home games at Bescot Stadium, moving from the Trevor Brown Memorial Ground and West Ham United signed a one-year deal with Dagenham & Redbridge F.C. to play at Victoria Road for the season having previously played at the club's Rush Green training ground stadium. In a bid to enable increased attendances amid COVID-19 restrictions and social distancing measures, Bristol City announced they were moving from the 1,500 capacity Stoke Gifford Stadium in Filton which had been purpose-built by the club in 2011 ahead of the first WSL season, to Twerton Park, an 3,528 capacity stadium home to Bath City.

Personnel and kits

Managerial changes

League table

Results

Season statistics

Top scorers

Top assists

Clean sheets

Awards

Monthly awards

Annual awards

See also
2020–21 FA Women's League Cup
2020–21 FA Women's Championship (tier 2)
2020–21 FA Women's National League (tier 3)

References

External links
Official website

Women's Super League seasons
1
2020–21 domestic women's association football leagues